XCircuit is a Unix/X11 and Windows program for drawing publication-quality electrical circuit schematic diagrams and related figures and the production of circuit netlists through schematic capture. XCircuit regards circuits as inherently hierarchical and writes both PostScript output and hierarchical SPICE netlists. Circuit components are saved in and retrieved from libraries which are fully editable. XCircuit does not separate artistic expression from circuit drawing; it maintains flexibility in style without compromising the power of schematic capture.

History
XCircuit was written and is maintained by Tim Edwards, currently with Efabless Corp., formerly with the Johns Hopkins University Applied Physics Laboratory in Laurel, Maryland. XCircuit was initially written in the summer of 1993 as a drawing program to render circuit diagrams for an undergraduate electrical engineering course in the Johns Hopkins University Whiting School of Engineering Part-time programs. Since then it has expanded to encompass schematic capture and is used by people all over the world for both presentations and as an EDA (Electronic Design Automation) tool.

PCB layout editing can be accomplished with the program "PCB" that can use net-lists and other files from XCircuit.

See also

 Comparison of EDA software
 List of free electronics circuit simulators

References

External links
 

Free electronic design automation software
Free diagramming software
Electronic design automation software for Linux
Software that uses Tk (software)